Lucius Hedius Rufus Lollianus Avitus (fl. 2nd century) was a Roman senator and military officer. He was consul in the year 144 as the colleague of Titus Statilius Maximus.

Biography
Rufus Lollianus was a member of the gens Hedia Lolliana, which probably originated from the region of Liguria. He was the son of Lucius (Hedius Rufus) Lollianus Avitus, who was appointed suffect consul in AD 114. A noted orator, he was elected to the office of consul in AD 144 alongside Titus Statilius Maximus. This was followed by his appointment as curator operum publicorum (or curator of public works) in 146.

Probably around AD 157/8 Rufus Lollianus was appointed the Proconsular governor of Africa; his legatus proconsularis was Gaius Vibius Gallio Claudius Severus. During his next appointment as Legatus Augusti pro praetore (or imperial governor) of Bithynia et Pontus in 159, he was confronted by Lucian about prosecuting Alexander of Abonoteichus; Rufus Lollianus demurred, claiming not only was Lucian's case weak, but that Alexander's patron, Publius Mummius Sisenna Rutilianus, was too influential to overcome. Around AD 162, he was assigned a special task when the emperor Lucius Aurelius Verus left for the Parthian campaign.

Rufus Lollianus was a patronus of Helvius Successus, the father of the future emperor Pertinax. He was also an amicus of Marcus Cornelius Fronto. Rufus Lollianus married a daughter of Decimus Terentius Gentianus, suffect consul of AD 116, and they had at least two children: Quintus Hedius Rufus Lollianus Gentianus, suffect consul around AD 186–188; and Lucius Hedius Rufus Lollianus, suffect consul before AD 193.

Sources
 Mennen, Inge, Power and Status in the Roman Empire, AD 193-284 (2011)

References

2nd-century Romans
Rufus Lollianus Avitus (consul 144), Lucius Hedius
Imperial Roman consuls
Roman governors of Africa
Roman governors of Bithynia and Pontus
Year of birth unknown
Year of death unknown